The 2005 Monaco Grand Prix (formally the Formula 1 Grand Prix de Monaco 2005) was a Formula One motor race held on 22 May 2005 at the Circuit de Monaco in Monte Carlo, Monaco. It was the sixth race of the 2005 Formula One World Championship, and the 63rd running of the Monaco Grand Prix.

The 78-lap race was won from pole position by Finnish driver Kimi Räikkönen, driving a McLaren-Mercedes. German Nick Heidfeld finished second in a Williams-BMW with his teammate, Australian Mark Webber, achieving his first F1 podium finish in third. Drivers' Championship leader, Spaniard Fernando Alonso, finished fourth in his Renault.

Report
The Grand Prix was held one month after the death of Prince Rainier III, for this reason, the Monegasque princely family did not attend the race for the first time in the Monaco Grand Prix's history. The BAR-Honda did not take part in this race, serving the last of a two race ban following irregularities at the San Marino Grand Prix.

Friday drivers 
The bottom six teams in the 2004 Constructors' Championship were entitled to run a third car in free practice on Friday. These drivers drove on Friday but did not compete in qualifying or the race.

Practice 

In practice, Christijan Albers lost his car out coming from turn 4 and crashed. Juan Pablo Montoya, Jacques Villeneuve, David Coulthard and Ralf Schumacher crashed as they were coming up high from Beau Rivage. Montoya was judged to be the cause of this incident and thus was forced to start the race from the back of the grid.

Race 

Polesitter Kimi Räikkönen led the field from the start of the race, and though he was at first closely followed by Fernando Alonso, he was more than five seconds ahead by the twentieth lap. Meanwhile, Narain Karthikeyan retired with a hydraulic failure. The race progressed otherwise uneventfully, with Fernando Alonso followed by Giancarlo Fisichella, Jarno Trulli, and Mark Webber, until the twenty-third lap, when Christijan Albers spun his Minardi into a wall at Mirabeau, blocking about two-thirds of the width of the track. David Coulthard, arriving behind him, swerved and successfully stopped his Red Bull without damage; however, Michael Schumacher plowed into Coulthard, breaking off his own nosecone and damaging the Red Bull's suspension beyond repair. As more drivers reached the blocked turn, the Safety Car was deployed so that marshals could remove Albers' car.

Both Renault drivers pitted immediately, but Räikkönen - acting on instructions from McLaren chief strategist Neil Martin - continued on in what was to prove a winning move. Though this seemingly put Räikkönen in a bad spot, as all of his close competitors had pitted, he fought back with a series of brilliant laps that would give him a 34.7-second lead by the time he pitted on lap 42. Alonso, whose car was substantially slower as it was full of fuel, and whose rear tyres were wearing rapidly, was unable to catch up, and Räikkönen, after pitting, returned to the track still 13 seconds ahead. He would go on to win the race having led every lap of it.

Nick Heidfeld worked his way up from sixth grid position, passing his own teammate in the pits after Williams called him in a lap earlier whilst Alonso was badly holding the two Williams drivers up.  After Heidfeld's stop, a superb overtaking manoeuvre into the Nouvelle chicane put him ahead of Alonso.  Webber tried to follow suit a lap later, but on the first attempt Alonso cut the corner and stayed in front. On the second attempt Alonso cut the corner again, this time clearly intentionally, but Webber eventually succeeded in overtaking him and claiming his first career podium in Formula One and scoring Williams last double podium finish until the 2014 Abu Dhabi Grand Prix over nine years later. Alonso straggled into fourth, his rear tyres almost entirely bald. Montoya advanced from sixteenth on the grid to an eventual fifth, finishing on Alonso's tail, followed by Michael and Ralf Schumacher, who crossed the line almost side-by-side.

Both Red Bull Racing cars ran with the Star Wars: Episode III – Revenge of the Sith livery and, for this race, the Red Bull Racing pit crew dressed up as Imperial Stormtroopers. It didn't help the team's fortunes, as this was the first race where they failed to score points.

Classification

Qualifying

Notes
 – Narain Karthikeyan received a 10-place grid penalty for an engine change.
 – Ralf Schumacher received a 10-place grid penalty for an engine change. In addition, his total time was added by 0.5 seconds for using the wrong tire in practice.
 – Juan Pablo Montoya's Saturday time of 1:14.858 deleted as punishment for role in earlier practice accident.

Race

Championship standings after the race 

Drivers' Championship standings

Constructors' Championship standings

See also 
 2005 Monaco GP2 Series round

References

Monaco Grand Prix
Monaco Grand Prix
Grand Prix
May 2005 sports events in Europe